Kardosné (16th century) was the mistress of Hungarian king János Szapolyai.  She lived in Debrecen and she had no children with Szapolyai.

Sources 
 S. Sroka: Jadwiga Zapolya; Kraków 2005

16th-century Hungarian people
Mistresses of Hungarian royalty
People from Debrecen